Pachydactylus rugosus, also known as the common rough gecko, wrinkled thick-toed gecko, rough thick-toed gecko, or rough-scaled gecko, is a species of lizard in the family Gekkonidae. It is found in South Africa, Namibia, and Botswana.

References

Pachydactylus
Geckos of Africa
Reptiles of Botswana
Reptiles of Namibia
Reptiles of South Africa
Reptiles described in 1849
Taxa named by Andrew Smith (zoologist)